Joona Laukka (born 30 June 1972) is a Finnish former racing cyclist. He won the Finnish national road race title in 1996. He also competed in the road race event at the 1996 Summer Olympics. During the 1998 Tour de France Laukka escaped with six other riders in a breakaway that stayed away to the finish and as a result he was in 4th place overall for two stages. He would eventually abandon the 98 Tour, but finished the 1997 Tour de France in the top quarter of the field coming in 35th place.

Laukka won the 1994 edition of Tour de Wallonie.

References

External links
 

1972 births
Living people
Finnish male cyclists
Sportspeople from Helsinki
Olympic cyclists of Finland
Cyclists at the 1996 Summer Olympics